The William Page House is a historic house in Glasgow, Kentucky. It was built in 1814-1815 by William Page, a farmer, on land he had brought from John H. Baker in 1812. The house was inherited by his daughter Elizabeth, who married Colonel Robert Strange;  it has also been known as the Colonel Robert Strange House. The family owned slaves. The house was designed in the Federal architectural style. It has been listed on the National Register of Historic Places since May 20, 1983.

It has an early hall-parlor plan, "exceptionally well-laid brick work," and "very fine interior woodwork".

References

National Register of Historic Places in Barren County, Kentucky
Federal architecture in Kentucky
Houses completed in 1814
1814 establishments in Kentucky
Houses in Barren County, Kentucky
Glasgow, Kentucky
Houses on the National Register of Historic Places in Kentucky
Hall and parlor houses